Accelerator-in-Chief is a nickname or jargon used for Chinese leader Xi Jinping, whose internal and foreign policies accelerate/expedite the process of either "bringing China to a strong rivalry with the superpowers", or "the collapse of the CCP". This term is patterned after Architect-in-Chief, a commonly-used title for Deng Xiaoping, the Chinese leader who initiated the Reform and Opening of the PRC.

It became popular in early 2020 on Twitter and are widely used by Chinese liberals and supporters for democracy as a slang to express dissatisfaction with censorship and highhand policies. Some users think if the system is beyond repair, instead of opposing or correcting its problems, it is a better choice to accelerate its original course towards demise.

Reference

Xi Jinping
Chinese Internet slang
2020 neologisms
Chinese political satire